Bình Tân is an urban district of Ho Chi Minh City, Vietnam, and is known as a large inner city of migrant workers. In 2010 the district had a population of 611,170, in an area of 52 km². The name is a combination of Bình Hưng Hoà, Bình Trị Đông and Tân Tạo.

Geographical location 

Bình Tân district borders District 12 and Hóc Môn district to the north, District 8 and Bình Chánh district to the south, District 6, District 8 and Tân Phú district to the east, and Bình Chánh district to the west.

Administration
Bình Tân district consists of ten wards:

Healthcare
Located in Binh Tan district, Hoa Lam-Shangri-La Healthcare Techpark is the first healthcare park in Ho Chi Minh City and Vietnam with 1,700 bed capacity. There are two commissioned hospitals, including City International Hospital and Gia An 115 Hospital serving a population of 700 thousands in the region, from primary care to tertiary care.

References

Districts of Ho Chi Minh City